Jules René Lucien Belbenoît (4 April 1899 – 25 February 1959) was a French prisoner on Devil's Island who successfully escaped to the United States. He later published the memoirs, Dry Guillotine (1938) and Hell on Trial (1940), about his exploits.

Early life
René Belbenoît was born on April 4, 1899 in Paris.

During his childhood, in the 1900s, Belbenoît was abandoned by his mother, Louise Daumière, while she was working as a teacher for the children of the Czar of Russia. Belbenoît's father, Louis Belbenoît, who worked as the conductor of the Paris-Orleans Express, was rarely at home and could not raise the young René himself. Belbenoît was then sent to live with his grandparents.

In 1911, when Belbenoît was 12 years old, his grandparents died suddenly and he, again in need of a parental figure, went to Paris where he lived with, and worked for, his uncle at a popular nightclub.

Between 1913 and 1916, Belbenoît worked in uncle's nightclub, the Café du Rat Mort on Place Pigalle in Paris. A teenager left to his own devices, he quickly became known to the law for petty shoplifting in 1916 and did not escape the house of correction.

From 1916 to 1917, Belbenoît served with distinction in the French army during World War I. He survived the Battle of Verdun, when he was 17 years old, and the result was 305,000 dead and 400,000 wounded in the French and German camps.

Belbenoît had volunteered before the conscription call in 1918, when he was 19, and he was carrying out his military service while the French Army signed the Armistice between France, the United Kingdom and Germany on November 11, 1918. He left the army in 1920.

Scams, burglaries and thefts 
During the period 1920/1921, Belbenoît committed several scams, burglaries and shoplifting offences. When he committed his crimes, Belbenoît was operating in Tours, Saint-Nazaire, Chartres, in company which he had come to know in the past. Aged 21, then 22, when he defrauded, robbed and robbed people — these events taking place over a year — Belbenoît accumulated a large number of victims. Belbenoît had no particular criteria for the victims, because he sometimes knew them very well, sufficiently well, less well, little, or even not at all.

In June 1921, Belbenoît began working in a restaurant in Besançon as a dishwasher, for eight francs a day with room and board. After having worked there for only 11 days, Belbenoît stole a wallet containing 4,000 francs, then a moped with which he left Besançon and moved to Nantes.

When he arrived in Nantes, Belbenoît was out of work in July 1921, then worked as a valet at the Ben Ali Castle, property of the Comtesse d'Entremeuse. Despite the benevolence of his employer, Belbenoît only worked for one month at the castle.

In August 1921, while working at Ben Ali Castle, Belbenoît took advantage of the monument to steal the pearls of the Comtesse d'Entremeuse as well as some money from her dressing table. Belbenoît escapes directly and finds refuge on a train to Paris. He finally goes to Dijon, after only two days in Paris.

On August 18, 1921, Belbenoît was hired as a waiter in a restaurant located in Dijon. The day after he was hired, Belbenoît broke into the room containing his boss's income and stole 2,800 francs from his boss's cash box. Following his crime, Belbenoît fled to Paris by train. Arrived in Paris, Belbenoît sent a letter to his boss in which he thanked her for the 2,800 francs. The boss lodged a complaint and the police managed to go back to the bank of Paris, using the stamp inscribed on the letter, then managed to identify the person who posted this letter; René Belbenoît, 22, wanted by the police in Tours, Saint-Nazaire, Chartres, Nantes and Besançon.

Arrest and trial 
René Belbenoît was arrested in Paris on August 21, 1921, and placed in pre-trial detention.

When he was placed in prison, after a first indictment for the theft from the restaurant in Dijon, Belbenoît was also charged with the multiple thefts, scams and frauds for which he was wanted. Although the acts committed by Belbenoît are misdemeanors, the young man is however sent back to the Dijon Assize Court, due to being in a state of recidivism.

Belbenoît appeared on May 22, 1922, before the Dijon Assize Court, for the acts of fraud, burglary and shoplifting committed in Tours, Saint-Nazaire, Chartres, Besançon, Nantes and Dijon. Belbenoît was then 23 years old and already had a heavy past behind him that did not incline to indulgence. Moreover, during the trial, Belbenoît behaved stoically, showed no remorse and was haughty. The Assize Court also considers that Belbenoît is far from being in a position to mend his ways, because he is in a state of recidivism.

At the end of his trial day, Belbenoît was sentenced to 8 years of forced labor in the penal colony of French Guiana. By virtue of the "doubling", this sentence means that beyond the time of forced labor, the convicted person is required to reside in French Guiana equal to his sentence before being able to return to mainland France.

Contesting his conviction, which forced him to stay in French Guiana until his death (even after his release), Belbenoît filed an appeal in cassation but the Court of Cassation dismissed the appeal a few months later. Belbenoît joined, in January 1923, the prison of Saint-Martin-de-Ré while waiting to serve his sentence in Prison in French Guiana.

On the morning of June 7, 1923, Belbenoît left the prison of Saint-Martin-de-Ré aboard the freighter Le Martinière. The journey lasts fourteen days during which all the prisoners condemned to the Bagne - killers and thieves - are transported and some of whom kill each other. .

Imprisonment

René Belbenoît landed on June 21, 1923, in the penal colony of Saint-Laurent-du-Maroni with the status of "transported". Aged only 24, Belbenoît offers a first escape plan to one of his fellow prisoners, Léonce, who accepts his proposal, also seeking to escape. Despite the warnings of more experienced prisoners, the two convicts then prepare provisions and a raft to ensure their escape.

On August 14, 1923, Belbenoît attempted a first escape in the company of Léonce. They embark using a raft, but, the current of the sea being relatively strong, the two convicts run aground a few kilometers further on the French shore. They spend the night there in traumatic circumstances, as he will explain in his book. The next morning, René and Léonce get back on their raft and manage to reach Dutch Guyana. They arrive on the shore but, forced to walk through the jungle, René and Léonce are surrounded by a troop of Indians, who bring them back to the penal colony of Saint-Laurent-du-Maroni. The two convicts are sent to the mitard du Bagne; place where other prisoners, having tried to escape, kill each other. Belbenoît nevertheless escaped death. After leaving the mitard, Belbenoît, still a convict in Cayenne, becomes a nurse and prepares a new escape plan.

On November 18, 1924, around 9 p.m., Belbenoît escaped again, in the company of a gang of "tough guys": "Lulu", "Gispy", "Jojo" (Gipsy's companion), "Le Basque", as well as three other convicts. But, the next morning, the canoe used by the escapees was deflected by the wind towards the Dutch coast. Following this, "Le Basque" (one of the escapees), calling himself "connaisseur", convinced the group to tie cords to the canoe. But the rope broke following three blows of the waves, thus carrying away the provisions. The rest of the troupe, being furious, "Le Basque" was stabbed in the heart on the order of "Lulu". A few days later, after a long journey, "Gipsy" killed "Jojo" with a saber in order to rob him. Following the discovery of "Jojo's" body by the other escapees, "Lulu" stabbed "Gipsy" and disembowelled him, before the five surviving members eat him. The next day, the troop resumed their march towards Dutch Guiana, before being surrounded by Indians, bringing the band back to the Bagne de Cayenne. Belbenoît sees his sentence increased by six months, while the others take an additional year. Belbenoît, participant throughout the escape, will admit in his book that he "was no longer himself", due to several days of escapade, starvation and journey.

Following his return to Bagne de Cayenne, René Belbenoît signed a petition to protest against the conditions of detention. The revolts of Belbenoît annoying the administration of the Bagne, led to his being placed under the surveillance of the policemen of the Bagne de Cayenne, in 1925 and 1926, but nevertheless aroused a lively debate among journalists on the subject.

In July and August 1927, a British journalist, having interviewed Belbenoît, published press articles on the daily life of the convicts of Cayenne. Following this, Belbenoît, aged 28, attempted two new escapes, but these did not succeed and he saw his sentence increased by thirteen months from his conviction; 9 years and one month of forced labor instead of the 8 years of forced labor to which he had been sentenced.

Release and recidive 
René Belbenoît was released from the Bagne de Cayenne on September 21, 1930, after serving his 9 years in prison. Before Siadous was transferred back to France, he gave Belbenoît a one-year permit to leave the penal colony. Belbenoît spent most of this year working in the Panama Canal Zone as a gardener. However, with the one year permit soon to expire he decided to go back to France in order to argue his case.

In November 1931, having a strong desire to return to Paris, Belbenoît decided to embark on a boat leading to Le Havre, but was stopped when he arrived at his destination. Belbenoît is charged with violation of his parole and for having violated his judicial control during his release. Belbenoît returns to prison, awaiting trial.

On October 14, 1933, Belbenoît was sentenced to 3 years of additional forced labor for his clandestine return to France. He was sent back to Guyana Bagne de Cayenne by the same freighter in the company of Henri Charrière, known as "Papillon".

Release, escape and success of "Dry Guillotine"

On November 2, 1934 Belbenoît was officially released—but that just meant he became a libéré, a free prisoner who was still not allowed to return to France. He made a living by capturing and selling butterflies and making items out of natural rubber and selling them. During the years of his imprisonment he had lost all his teeth. Belbenoît plans yet another escape. He meets five other convicts, nicknamed: "Bébère", "Dadar", "Cap", "Panama" and "Chiflot" who are also forced to stay in Guyana until the end of their lives.

On May 2, 1935, the six ex-convicts escaped; thus managing to escape. Belbenoît and his gang escape from the colony by sea. The six escapees travel for seventeen days in a nineteen-foot boat and then reached Trinidad where the English entrust them with a sinking trawler. The escapees could stay on the island for three weeks and were given new supplies, and even a new boat. On June 10, they continued their trip. Sixteen days later they ran aground on a beach in Colombia, and locals stole their clothing. They reached Santa Marta, Colombia, where a local general fed them, but he also notified the French consul and took them to the local military prison.

However, some of the local authorities separated Belbenoît from the others and, with the cooperation of local prison authorities, a sympathetic local newspaperman helped him to escape in April 1936 in exchange for writing about prison conditions. Belbenoît traveled slowly north and stole a number of native canoes to continue his journey. 

In Panama he spent about seven months with the Kuna tribe and later sold a large collection of butterflies in Panama City. There he also met Preston Rambo, who worked to translate his manuscript into English. In La Libertad, El Salvador, he hid in a ship that took him to Los Angeles in March 1937.

In 1938, his account, Dry Guillotine, was published in United States with an introduction by the prominent South American explorer and journalist William LaVarre. The memoir went through 14 printings in less than a year.

The book attracted the attention of the U.S. immigration authorities, and Belbenoît was arrested. He received a visitor's visa but in 1941 was told to leave the country. Belbenoît then traveled to Mexico, and a year later tried to slip back into the United States. However, he was arrested in Brownsville, Texas and sentenced to 15 months in prison. After his release,  Belbenoît acquired a valid passport and went to Los Angeles to work for Warner Bros. as a technical advisor for the film Passage to Marseille (1944).

In 1951, Belbenoît moved to Lucerne Valley, California and founded the René's Ranch Store, where he also lived. Neighbors knew who he was. His new book, Hell on Trial (1940), again attracted the attention of immigration authorities, and in May 1951 he was summoned to Los Angeles. His former movie co-workers spoke on his behalf, and he received US citizenship in 1956.

Personal life
Belbenoît married Lee Gumpert, a widow who had one son, William Gumpert.

Death
Belbenoît died of cardiac arrest in his store in Lucerne Valley, California, on February 26, 1959, aged 59.

Bibliography

Books by René Belbenoît 
 
  (The sequel to Dry Guillotine.)

Books about  René Belbenoît

Magazines

Newspapers

References

External links
Inventory  of Belbenoît Collection at the Harry Ransom Center
Pictures of Belbenoît and Dry guillotine manuscript
A verdadeira historia de Papillon, istoe.com
Portrait of Belbenoît by Hansel Mieth
Video with Belbenoît on Criticalpast.com

French escapees
Escapees from French detention
20th-century French criminals
French memoirists
French military personnel of World War I
1899 births
1959 deaths
Devil's Island inmates
French male non-fiction writers
20th-century memoirists
20th-century French male writers